Carrosserie Hibbard et Darrin was a French coachbuilder which operated from 12 Rue de Berri, 75008, Paris, just off the Champs-Élysées. Owned by two Americans, Hibbard and Darrin it built bodies for the most luxurious chassis.

Hibbard and Dietrich LeBaron
Two American designers, Thomas L. Hibbard (1898-1982) and Raymond H. Dietrich had met while working for Brewster. Tiring of the corporate environment they started freelance work in their spare time and when William H Brewster discovered this he fired Dietrich. Hibbard left too. They decided to set up on their own and formed a new company and called it LeBaron after a family friend. LeBaron did not build car bodies, they sold designs.

Hibbard et Darrin

Fellow designer, Howard "Dutch" Darrin (1897-1982) met Tom Hibbard in 1923. Hibbard by this time had left LeBaron and the two decided to go to Paris, initially to try to sell LeBaron designs but instead decided to set up their own company and founded Hibbard & Darrin.

Over the next few years they designed innovatively styled bodies for many of Europe's most prestigious car makers but the partnership ended in 1931 when Hibbard returned to the USA to take up a position in General Motors' design department.

Fernandez et Darrin
Darrin however remained in France and formed a new company with a wealthy French banker named Fernandez calling it Fernandez and Darrin.

U.S. - "Darrin of Paris"
Darrin returned to the United States in 1937 to set up his own Darrin of Paris on Sunset Boulevard, Hollywood managing to convince prospective customers he was a Frenchman.

Howard "Dutch" Darrin designed cars for Kaiser and Studebaker. With Bill Tritt he designed the Kaiser Darrin sports car. For Studebaker, renamed Studebaker Packard after their merger, he designed cars that were never produced, but can be seen at the Studebaker National Museum in South Bend, Indiana. With his sons he designed some replica cars that were sold in kit form.

References

Coachbuilders of France